The Northern Pacific Railroad Settling Tanks in Glendive, Montana were built in 1905 by the Northern Pacific Railroad.  The site was listed on the National Register of Historic Places in 1988.  The listing included two contributing buildings and two contributing structures.  It includes a caretaker's cottage built in about 1910.  The site has also been known as Glendive City Shops, as they have been repurposed as city maintenance facilities.

It was listed on the National Register as part of a study of multiple historic resources in Glendive, which also listed several others.

References

National Register of Historic Places in Dawson County, Montana
Transport infrastructure completed in 1910
Transportation in Dawson County, Montana
Northern Pacific Railway
Rail infrastructure on the National Register of Historic Places in Montana